Alyonka is a 1961 Soviet comedy film directed by Boris Barnet.

Plot 
The film tells about one of the key stages of the organization of the socialist system in Russia, which is shown through the eyes of a girl named Alyonka.

The action occurs during the Virgin Lands campaign. Alyonka is forced to leave her parents because there is no school in a new council. The people traveling with her tell about their life during a long way.

Cast 
 Natalya Ovodova as Alyonka Muratova (as Natasha Ovodova)
 Irina Zarubina as Vasilisa Petrovna
 Vasiliy Shukshin as Stepan Revan (as V. Shukshin)
 Nikolay Bogolyubov as Dmitri Prokofitch
 Erast Garin as Konstantin Venyaminovich
 Nikolay Kryuchkov as Roman Semyonovich
 Evgeniy Shutov
Natalya Seleznyova as Elizaveta

References

External links 
 

1961 films
1960s Russian-language films
Soviet comedy films
Mosfilm films